was a rensho of the Kamakura shogunate from 1326 to 1327.

References

1280s births
1327 deaths
Hōjō clan
People of Kamakura-period Japan